Letícia Parente   (1930–1991)  was a Brazilian visual artist who specialized in politically charged video art. Her surreal short films feature elements of body art and performance art. Much of her work is centered around protesting the use of mass torture by the Military dictatorship in Brazil throughout the 1970s. Besides her work in activism and art, Parente also held a Chemistry PhD and never left her scientific career after discovering art.

Biography 

Letícia Parente was born in Salvador, Bahia, Brazil in 1930. While originally pursuing a degree in chemistry, she became interested in art at the age of 41 and studied printing techniques at the Núcleo de Artes e Criatividade in Rio de Janeiro. Shortly after, she met other artists like Anna Bella Geiger and Sonia Andrade who introduced her to video art. Besides video art, Parente and her artist peers were also pioneers of other experimental art forms in Brazil during the 1970s. These included works of experimental audio-visual slides, photography, mail art, and utilization of xeroxing. The slideshow was an especially popular medium among Brazilian artists in the 1970’s. Parente notably used this medium in her piece Auto-retrato (1975), a compilation of twenty-eight slides of photographs depicting a variety of subjects ranging from objects to people. Unfortunately, due to the fragile nature of the materials used by Parente to create her works and lack of means of preservation through proper art institutions, most of her 1970s projects have been lost to time.

Alongside her discovery and love for art, Parente also continued to pursue her career in science. She completed her master’s degree at Pontifícia Universidade Católica in analytical chemistry in 1972, and obtained her Livre Docente title in inorganic chemistry in 1976 through the Universidade Federal Fluminense. She would go on to teach chemistry in higher-education institutions in both Brazil and Italy, and also published a handful of books and articles based on her studies.

Art 

Her most well known work is "Marca Registrada", a silent VHS film which depicts the artist sewing the words "MADE IN BRASIL" onto the sole of her foot. Another film from the same period, "In", follows Parente as she suspends herself using a dresser hanger in a closet. According to artist Myriam Gurba, this video serves in part as an allusion to the execution of Brazilian journalist Vladimir Herzog by torture. The police attempted to cover-up his death as a suicide and he was found hanged in his prison cell. 

In 1976, Parente combined her dual interests in science and art to create the exhibition Medidas (Measurements), held at the Museum of Modern Art, Rio de Janeiro. Visitors used scientific and pseudoscientific devices to measure their own physical, intellectual, and emotional conditions, for the purpose of “...exposing both the power and the limitations of scientific methods to assess, classify, and regulate individuals' bodies and subjectivities.” This exhibition is considered to be the first exhibition in Brazil to combine science and art.

Selected works 
Marca Registrada (1975) 
In (1975)
Preparação I (1975) 
Tarefa I (1982)

References 

1930 births
1991 deaths
20th-century Brazilian women artists
People from Salvador, Bahia
Brazilian video artists
Women video artists